Carl Schweninger the Younger (May 17, 1854 – December 27, 1912) was an Austrian painter.

Life 
Carl Schweninger was born in Vienna, Austria and came from a Viennese artist family. He was the son of the painter Carl Schweninger the Elder and brother of the painter Rosa Schweninger. He learned painting first from his father, then he studied from 1871 to 1873 with Karl Mayer at the general painting school of the Academy of Fine Arts Vienna. After completing his studies, he went on a trip to Germany, where he also continued his studies at the Academy of Fine Arts, Munich.

In 1883, he exhibited his work The Pocket Player at the International Art Exhibition in the Munich Glass Palace.

Carl Schweninger mainly painted Rococo genre scenes. Many of his pictures have been published in magazines such as Die Gartenlaube, Ueber Land und Meer, and Moderne Kunst. He also crafted sculptures.

Schweninger created illustrations for the poetry of German poets, such as Ferdinand Freiligrath's O lieb 'as long as you can love and Joseph Victor von Scheffel's Der Trompeter von Säckingen.

Gallery

Literature 

 In: Hans Vollmer (Hrsg.): Founded by Ulrich Thieme and Felix Becker . vol 30 : Scheffel – Siemerding . EA Seemann, Leipzig 1936, p. 380.
 H. Grimm: Schweninger, Carl d. J. (1854-1912). In: Austrian Biographical Lexicon 1815–1950 (ÖBL). Volume 12, Verlag der Österreichischen Akademie der Wissenschaften, Vienna 2005, ISBN 3-7001-3580-7 , p. 48.

References 

 https://portal.dnb.de/opac.htm?method=simpleSearch&cqlMode=true&query=nid%3D138571902
 https://www.invaluable.com/auction-lot/bronze,-karl-schweninger-the-younger-6357-c-064d9a0418

Austrian painters
Austrian artists
1854 births
1912 deaths
Artists from Vienna
Austrian male painters
19th-century Austrian painters